Susta may refer to:

Geography
Susta territory, a disputed territory between Nepal and India
Susta Rural Municipality, in Lumbini Province, Nepal
Sustaš, a village in Montenegro
Bardaghat Susta East, one of two parliamentary constituencies of the Parasi District of Nepal
Bardaghat Susta West, one of two parliamentary constituencies of the Parasi District of Nepal

Other uses
Susta (surname) (sometimes Šusta)
The Federation of Ukrainian Student Organizations of America
Southern United States Trade Association